The Botanist is a dry gin made by the Bruichladdich Distillery on Islay, Scotland. It is one of two gins made on the island and is known for its hand-foraged botanicals. The botanicals are collected from all over Islay between March and October by professional foragers. The name was inspired by the two local botanists who helped develop the recipe for the gin alongside former Master Distiller, Jim McEwan.

Distillation

The Botanist gin is distilled after an overnight maceration of nine base botanicals (the seed, berry, bark, root, and peel categories) in 100% wheat spirit and Islay spring water. This alcohol vapor infusion from the distillation then passes through a botanical basket containing the collected leaves and petals. This double infusion gives the Botanist gin its distinct flavor.

The Botanist is slow distilled in the Lomond still "Ugly Betty", one of the last in existence. The distillation takes 17 hours. Distilling takes place at 0.2 atmospheres of pressure.

Ugly Betty

Developed after World War II, the Lomond still was an experimental cross between a column and a pot still designed to meet the growing demand for single malt whiskies. It was designed as a "one-stop-shop" still by chemical engineer Alistair Cunningham and draftsman Arthur Warren in 1955 as a way to create a variety of whisky styles.

Tom Morton described Ugly Betty in his book Spirit of Adventure as "An oversized, upside-down dustbin made of copper."

Ingredients
Two types of juniper are included, including prostrate juniper (Juniperus communis subspecies) that grows in the exposed sea level habitats of the Rhinns of Islay. Only a symbolic amount of Juniperus communis is added.

The Islay spring water from which this gin is made comes from "Dirty Dottie’s spring" on Octomore farm, both for the distillation and the bottling.

The gin is influenced exclusively by the foraged botanicals; no other essences, oils, or flavorings are added. The use aromatic plants for flavoring spirit is not new. Islay’s distillers traditionally used whatever was at hand to improve their usquebaugh (whisky), distilled on small, portable stills that were hidden in remote glens.

Botanicals

 Angelica root *
 Apple Mint
  Birch leaves
  Bog Myrtle leaves
 Cassia bark *
 Chamomile (sweet)
 Cinnamon bark *
 Coriander seed *
 Creeping Thistle flowers
 Elder flowers
 Gorse flowers
  Heather flowers
 Hawthorn flowers
  Juniper (prostrate) berries
 Juniper berries *
 Lady’s Bedstraw flowers
 Lemon Balm
  Lemon peel *
 Liquorice root *
 Meadow Sweet
 Orange peel *
  Orris root *
 Peppermint leaves
 Mugwort leaves
 Red Clover flowers
 Sweet Cicely leaves
 Tansy
 Thyme leaves
  Water Mint leaves
 White Clover
  Wood Sage leaves

(*) = non-Islay botanical

Reviews and reception
The Botanist received critical acclaim for its first distillation, with features in both gin and whisky blogs and reviews.

Awards
The Botanist was awarded the Diamond prize at the Monaco Concours of the Femmes et Spiriteux du Monde in 2011.

References

External links
 

Gins